Kurendhoo (Dhivehi: ކުރެންދޫ) is one of the inhabited islands of Lhaviyani Atoll, Maldives.

Geography

Demography

Economy

The island is small and people earn their living mainly on tourist resort jobs and government jobs. Notable number of people earn their money from agriculture, local shops, tuna fishing, grouper fishing, and other forms of harvesting such as lobster and sea cucumber. Moreover, now the island also introduced guest house business.

References

Islands of the Maldives